Highland Historic District may refer to:

in the United States
 Highland Historic District (Highland, California), listed on the NRHP in California
 Highland Historic District (Middletown, Connecticut), listed on the NRHP in Connecticut
 Highland Historic District (Waterloo, Iowa), listed on the NRHP in Iowa
 Highland Historic District (Shreveport, Louisiana), listed on the NRHP in Louisiana

See also
Highlands Historic District (disambiguation)